Rebeca Bernal Rodríguez (born 31 August 1997), is a Mexican professional footballer who plays as a centre back for Liga MX Femenil club CF Monterrey and the Mexico women's national team.

Career
She played for Mexico in a 2017 friendly against Sweden.

International goals

Honors and awards

International
Mexico U17
 CONCACAF Women's U-17 Championship: 2013

References

External links
 
 

1997 births
Living people
Women's association football central defenders
Mexican women's footballers
Footballers from Tamaulipas
Sportspeople from Tampico, Tamaulipas
Mexico women's international footballers
Liga MX Femenil players
C.F. Monterrey (women) players
LGBT association football players
Mexican LGBT sportspeople
20th-century Mexican women
21st-century Mexican women
Mexican footballers